Marika Bangó (born 14 December 1966) is a Hungarian singer, lyricist, composer, performer and the daughter of singer Margit Bangó. She released her first studio album titled "Gömbbe zart világ" in 2016. She is one of the better-known figures of Budapest's nightlife, and has performed successfully in many nightclubs and bars.

Biography
Bangó was born on 14 December 1966 in Vásárosnamény, the daughter of singer Margit Bangó and musician Lajos Bangó. Her interest in music showed early on, but she left her career vision behind due to early childbearing. At the age of 15, she gave birth to her first child, Tina Jellinek, who was later followed by three children. Bangó turned to music in the 2010s, when her children became adults and she herself was able to start an independent career. She signed a contract with Trimedio Music Kft., where her first studio album was released in 2016 with the title "Gömbbe zárt vilák" with fun and gypsy songs. The disc was a success, and both online and physical sales indicated that audiences liked the disc.  had Bangó a wide fan base even before the album was released, as she frequently performed with artists popular in the Budapest nightlife, such as Amanda Elstak or her own mother.

Personal life
Bangó has two sons and two daughters and six grandchildren. Among her children, Tina Jellinek is known to the public for her television appearances. Bangó's husband, Elemér Horváth, is a musician who was once the husband of her mother Margit Bangó.

Discography
 2016 - Gömbbe zárt világ

References

1966 births
Living people
People from Vásárosnamény
Hungarian Romani people
Romani musicians
20th-century Hungarian women singers
21st-century Hungarian women singers